Edip is a Turkish given name. People named Edip include:

 Halide Edip Adıvar (1884–1964), Turkish novelist and feminist
 Edip Cansever (1928–1986), Turkish poet
 Edip Yüksel (born 1957), Turkish American intellectual

Turkish masculine given names